Lionel Mathis (born 4 October 1981) is a French former professional footballer who played as a midfielder.

Career
Whilst at Guingamp, then in Ligue 2, Mathis played in the 2009 Coupe de France Final in which his club beat Rennes. He was part of the side which won the Coupe de France again against the same opposition in 2014, this time as a Ligue 1 side.

He retired in the summer 2017.

Honours
Auxerre
 Coupe de France: 2002–03, 2004–05
 Coupe Gambardella: 1999

Guingamp
 Coupe de France: 2008–09, 2013–14

France
 UEFA European Under-18 Championship: 2000
 UEFA European Under-21 Championship runner-up: 2002

Individual
 Ligue 1 Young Player of the Year: 2002–03

References

External links
 
 

1981 births
Living people
Sportspeople from Montreuil, Seine-Saint-Denis
Association football midfielders
French footballers
France under-21 international footballers
France youth international footballers
AJ Auxerre players
FC Sochaux-Montbéliard players
En Avant Guingamp players
INF Clairefontaine players
Ligue 1 players
Ligue 2 players
Footballers from Seine-Saint-Denis